Aaron Burr Caswell (1807–1896) was an American frontiersman and the first white man to occupy any part of Mason County, Michigan. He became the county's first coroner, probate judge and surveyor; and constructed its first framed building that functioned as a home, courthouse and jail—it is also the only surviving landmark of Mason County's earliest history. Caswell was also the progenitor of a prominent Mason County family.

Early life
Caswell was born in 1807 as Aaron Burr Caswell at Glens Falls, New York. He was named after Aaron Burr, one of the Founding Fathers of the United States, and went by his middle name, Burr, for most of his life. His parents were George and Sarah (Green) Caswell. He practiced woodworking as his first trade for several years in Glens Falls. Caswell married Hannah Green in 1837 at Glens Falls, where they remained through 1839. They went to Mississippi in 1840 and were employed on the river boats. In 1841, he moved his family to Barrington Station, Lake County, Illinois, where they bought a farm and lived for six years.

Mid life

Caswell went on a hunting and fishing trip in 1845 to Pere Marquette Township in Mason County, Michigan. He hunted in the territory for the next two years, though he spent most of his time fishing. He briefly returned to Illinois in 1847 to retrieve his family for relocating back to the Michigan area permanently. Burr was forty years old and his wife a year or two younger. The children he had at the time were Mary (15), George (13), Helen (10), and Edgar (7).

Caswell sold the Illinois family farm, but kept the oxen, cows, and pigs. The Caswell family with their farm animals then took the commercial schooner The Eagle out of Chicago and sailed several days north up Lake Michigan to Pere Marquette township. When they arrived at the Pere Marquette River they realized the entrance channel to shore was too shallow for the large commercial ship they were on to dock at so they came ashore in its small yawl transport sailboat. The farm animals that they were hauling were forced overboard and had to fend for themselves to get ashore. A distant relative, Frances Caswell Hanna, relates in her book Sand, Sawdust and Sawlogs the story of their dramatic arrival.

Caswell and his family were the first permanent white settlers in the Pere Marquette Lake area, which was considered a frontier. He had a good relationship with the local Michigan Ottawa Indians and learned their customs and religion. His family lived in dense wilderness and they built a small two-story frame house in 1849 out of old driftwood. It was near the Indian village of Nin-de-be-ka-tun-ning, a village of bark and log rectangular lodges that had dome-shaped roofs. Caswell's house was the first frame structure in Mason County; it still stands at White Pine Village where it was placed as the Mason County Historical Society's outdoor museum's centerpiece, very close its original constructed location.

Caswell continually improved his farm while he worked in the lumber industry. When Mason County officially became a county in 1855 from the old Notipekago County, Caswell allowed the first floor of his farmhouse to be used as a courthouse and trading post and the family moved upstairs. The Mason County Courthouse county seat was located at Caswell's house from 1856 to 1861 where judges and lawyers came on horseback. For many years, Caswell produced lumber and shingles from the local timber and it was shipped to Chicago for construction. He operated the boat Ranger for years to deliver his lumber products.

The village that developed around the Caswells was called Pere Marquette (later Ludington), in honor of the missionary who died in the area in 1675, and the territory around the village was known as Pere Marquette Township. Caswell was a delegate to the Republican party convention in 1868. He was elected county treasurer and served on the county board. Caswell was the first Mason County surveyor, coroner, probate judge and fish inspector.

Later life

Caswell and his eldest son were originally fishermen and trappers before working at Baird and Bean Lumber Mill in downtown Ludington. After Caswell's wife, Hannah Green, died in 1870, he moved to downtown Ludington and became the manager of a local shingle mill. In the 1870s, he worked as a foreman at Moulton & Flagg, a shingle mill in Ludington.

In 1871, Caswell married Sarah Billings. They moved into the Big Sable Point Lighthouse in 1873, where Caswell eventually became its lightkeeper.  He served as its fourth keeper from January 9, 1874, to July 17, 1882. They lived in the lighthouse until 1878.

Caswell and his second wife later moved to Mitchell, South Dakota, where they operated a large hotel. The family returned to Ludington in 1886, where Caswell ten years later died. He is buried in Lakeview Cemetery in Ludington beside his first wife.

Further family history
Caswell's daughter Mary, who was born around 1835, married Richard Hatfield at the Caswell farmhouse in 1854. Hatfield himself became a notable fruit farmer. They had the first recorded marriage in Mason County.  She was the mother of fourteen children, nine of whom died before her death in 1882. Helen, Mary's younger sister, was born about 1837 and married Sewell Moulton. Caswell's last child was Edgar, who was born in 1840 in Illinois and married Julia Genia in 1871. Edgar became a prominent Ludington businessman.

Caswell's home 
Aside from the second floor, Caswell's home was used as the site of the first Pere Marquette Township meeting: the front half of his home was the site of the first county seat and the first courthouse in Mason County, the kitchen served as the county's first store and post office, and the basement was used as a temporary jail.  The building is recognized as a Registered State Historic Site, and the house was fully restored by the Mason County Historical Society between 1965 and 1976.

References

Citations

Bibliography

External links
 Mason County, Michigan Beginnings
 Aaron Burr Caswell, Mason County History Companion, Old Places Familiar Faces

1807 births
1896 deaths
Politicians from Glens Falls, New York
People of the Michigan Territory
Businesspeople from Michigan
County treasurers in Michigan
19th-century American politicians
19th-century American businesspeople